Discovery Kids is an Indian children's television channel owned by Warner Bros. Discovery Asia-Pacific, a division of Warner Bros. Discovery International, which is owned by Warner Bros. Discovery. The channel launched on 7 August 2012.

History
Discovery Kids is the first channel in the kids' genre in India by Discovery Networks Asia Pacific launched on 7 August 2012. Earlier it was the name of an Infotainment and edutainment kids programming block on Discovery Channel India which ran from 2001 to 2005. It is the eighth channel launched by Discovery India. The initial programming lineup consisted of a mix of animation and live action series under multiple genres such as adventure, mythology, nature, history and science.

Discovery India announced plans to revamp the channel in 2018 with new IPs. The revamp began the same day Discovery Jeet launched by removing all existing shows, except for Mister Maker at night and airing ZeeQ's Bandbudh Aur Budbak the whole day.

On 16 February 2018, the channel changed its logo to the current Latin American logo. To expand its reach in the South, Discovery Kids launched a Tamil-language audio track on 24 March 2018, and later a Telugu-language audio track on 1 April 2018.

The revamp was ultimately completed on 21 April 2018, the same day as the premiere of Discovery's latest local animation property called Little Singham, based on the original Singham film from 2011. The show launched with 156 episodes and five TV feature films. The English dubbed version started airing in July as a gradual rollout.kannada and malayalam were added on 19 october 2019

Discovery Kids saw an increase in ratings since the release of Bandbudh Aur Budbak on the channel. The launch of Little Singham helped the channel to achieve second position in the kids genre, with a reach of 24 million and 111 minutes per viewer.

Programming

See also
List of Indian animated television series
List of programmes broadcast by Cartoon Network (India)
List of programmes broadcast by Hungama TV
Pogo (TV channel)
List of programmes broadcast by Disney Channel (India)
Marvel HQ (India)
Nick HD+

References

External links
 Official Facebook page

Warner Bros. Discovery networks
English-language television stations in India
Television channels and stations established in 2012
Children's television channels in India
Children's television networks
Television stations in Mumbai
Indian animation
Discovery Kids (Indian TV channel) original programming
2012 establishments in Maharashtra